Barabàn is an Italian folk group focused on the musical traditions of northern Italy, especially that of the Po River valley.  Barabàn interprets the musical traditions of North Italy for the modern audience.  They are one of Italy's most popular and well-reviewed folk groups.

Founded in Milan in 1982, the group has released seven CDs and one DVD in addition to appearing on numerous compilations and at countless festivals.

Musicians
 Vincenzo Caglioti
 Aurelio Citelli
 Giuliano Grasso
 Antonio Neglia
 Alberto Rovelli
 Maddalena Soler

Discography
 Musa di pelle...pinfio di legno nero (1984)
 Il valzer dei disertori (1987)
 Naquane (1990)
 Live (1994)
 La Santa Notte dell'Oriente (1996)
 Terre di passo (2002)
 Venti5 d'Aprile (DVD, 2005)
 Voci di trincea (2015)

External links

Official website

1982 establishments in Italy
Italian folk music groups
Musical groups established in 1982
Musical groups from Milan

https://soundcloud.com/antifatis/baraban-la-merla
https://soundcloud.com/antifatis/baraban-la-merla